"I Believe My Heart" is a duet between Duncan James of English boy band Blue and British soprano Keedie Babb. The song was James' first release as a solo artist around the time when Blue went on hiatus. The song was written by David Zippel (lyrics) and Andrew Lloyd Webber (music) for use in the Lloyd Webber musical The Woman in White, which premiered the same year. Upon its release in October 2004, the single debuted and peaked at number two on the UK Singles Chart. Outside the UK, the song reached the top 20 in Italy and also charted in Belgium, Germany, Ireland, and Switzerland.

Music video
The video for the song, set in the grounds of a stately home with a maze, features Duncan James and Keedie dressed in wedding attire and looking for each other in the maze, including at nightfall. During the last section of the song, James and Keedie have found each other beneath a large oak tree.

Track listings
UK CD1
 "I Believe My Heart" – 3:56
 "I Believe My Heart" (instrumental) – 3:56
 "I Believe My Heart" (video) – 3:56

UK CD2, European and Japanese CD single
 "I Believe My Heart" – 3:56
 "I Believe My Heart" (instrumental) – 3:56

Charts

Weekly charts

Year-end charts

References

2004 debut singles
2004 songs
Duncan James songs
EMI Records singles
Male–female vocal duets
Songs with lyrics by David Zippel
Virgin Records singles